Thomas Enraght Lindsay was Archdeacon of Cleveland from 1907 until 1938.
 
The son of The Rev. Thomas Lindsay, he was educated at Manchester Grammar School and Sidney Sussex College, Cambridge. He was ordained in 1886 and became Chaplain of Epsom College. He then served a curacy in Doncaster he held incumbencies at Loversal (1891–1892); Middlesbrough (1893–1905); Scarborough (1905–1913); Saltburn-by-the-Sea (1913–1925); and Stokesley (1925–1936).

He died on 7 September 1947.

References

People educated at Manchester Grammar School
1947 deaths
Alumni of Sidney Sussex College, Cambridge
Archdeacons of Cleveland
Diocese of York